The 2015 African Games men's football tournament was the 11th edition of the African Games men's football tournament. The men's football tournament was held in Brazzaville, the Republic of the Congo between 6–18 September 2015 as part of the 2015 African Games. The tournament was age-restricted and open to men's under-23 national teams only.

Qualification

Congo qualified automatically as hosts, while the remaining seven spots were determined by the qualifying rounds, which were organized by the Confederation of African Football (CAF) and took place from February to April 2015.

Qualified teams
The following eight teams qualified for the final tournament.

On 26 August 2015, the CAF announced that Egypt had withdrawn from the competition. Burundi, the team eliminated by Egypt in the final round, declined to replace them due to short notice. Therefore, only seven teams competed in the tournament, and Group B, where Egypt were drawn in, was composed of three teams only.

Venues
A new 60,000 capacity stadium, Stade Municipal de Kintélé, was built for the 2015 African Games. The Stade Alphonse Massemba-Débat was also used.

Squads

Group stage
The draw was held on 9 July 2015, 11:00 UTC+2, at the CAF Headquarters in Cairo, Egypt. The eight teams were drawn into two groups of four. For the draw, the hosts Congo were seeded in position A1 and the holders Ghana were seeded in position B1. The remaining six teams were drawn from one pot to fill the other positions in the two groups.

The top two teams of each group advanced to the semi-finals.

All times were local, WAT (UTC+1).

Group A

Group B

Knockout stage

Bracket

Semi-finals

Bronze medal match

Gold medal match

Final ranking

Goalscorers
3 goals

 Mohamed Sydney Sylla
 Ibrahima Keita

2 goals
 Kader Bidimbou

1 goal

 Omar Kaboré
 Ziem Somda
 Junior Makiessé
 Merveil Ndockyt
 Mustapha Abdullahi
 Junior Ajayi
 Etor Daniel
 Kingsley Sokari
 Cheikhou Dieng
 Moussa Seydi
 Abuaagla Abdalla
 Walaa Eldin Yaqoub
 Tafadzwa Kutinyu

Own goal
 Ziem Somda (playing against Congo)

See also
Football at the 2015 African Games – Women's tournament

References

External links
Official Website of the African Games, Brazzaville 2015
African Games Men Brazzville 2015, CAFonline.com

Men's